The Gargaar Multi-speciality Hospital was founded in 2009. It is a multi-speciality private hospital, located in Hargeisa.

See also
 Hargeisa Group Hospital
 Edna Adan Maternity Hospital
Hargeisa Canadian Medical Center

References

External links

Hospitals in Somaliland